The New Jersey-New York 7 Conference was in the NCAA. The conference existed from 1976 to 1979.

Membership
Columbia University
Fordham University 
Manhattan College
Princeton University 
Rutgers University
Seton Hall University
St. John's University

Champions

Men's basketball
1977 Columbia/Seton Hall
1978 Rutgers/St. John's (N.Y.)
1979 Rutgers

External links
https://web.archive.org/web/20080510134324/http://www2.ncaa.org/portal/media_and_events/ncaa_publications/records_books/winter/basketball/index.html
http://www.sports-reference.com/cbb/conferences/NJNY/

Defunct NCAA Division I conferences
1976 establishments in the United States
1979 disestablishments in the United States
Sports leagues established in 1976
Sports leagues disestablished in 1979